The Junkers L2 was Junkers' first water-cooled four-stroke engine and the first to be built on a production line, though only 58 were made.  It was a six-cylinder inline engine and powered many Junkers aircraft until replaced by the more powerful L5.

Design and development
The Junkers L2 (the L signifying a four-stroke petrol engine rather than a two-stroke diesel) had some features in common with their first petrol engine, the L1, both six-cylinder upright direct drive inline engines with four overhead camshaft driven valves per cylinder, but was water-cooled rather than air-cooled and had a much greater swept volume.  It initially developed a cruise power of 195 horsepower (hp) (145 kW) at 1,550 rpm but was developed to 220 hp (164 kW).

Operational history
The L2 powered early versions of several Junkers aircraft.  It was soon replaced in these models by the more powerful Junkers L5 and only 58 L2s were built.

Variants
L2 initial version. 
L2a refined L2, 230 hp.

Applications
Early versions of
Junkers F 13
Junkers A 20
Junkers G 23
Junkers G 24
Junkers W 33
Re-engined
Junkers Ju 21

Specifications (L2)

See also

References

Bibliography

L2
1920s aircraft piston engines